Mambau is a suburb in Seremban, Negeri Sembilan, Malaysia. Mambau area includes Mambau old town, Kg Baru Mambau, Rumah Murah Rakyat Mambau, Kg Batu 3, Kg Kayu Ara, Kg Mambau, Taman Kelab Tuanku and Anak Air Garam. 

Mambau is located along  Federal Route 53, a trunk road that connects Seremban to the resort town of Port Dickson, located 30 km west of the city. In addition to that, Mambau is also the eastern end of the tolled Seremban-Port Dickson Highway (E29), which serves as an alternative to FT53.  
Mambau is a transit point of the historical Seremban-Port Dickson railway line, which is one of the earlier railway routes in Malaysia. 

Towns in Negeri Sembilan